The 2023 FIVB Volleyball Girls' U19 World Championship will be the 18th edition of the FIVB Volleyball Girls' U19 World Championship, the biennial international youth volleyball championship contested by the women's national teams under the age of 19 of the members associations of the  (FIVB), the sport's global governing body. It will be held in Croatia and Hungary from 1 to 11 August 2023.

This will be the first edition with under-19 national teams after FIVB decided, in March 2022, to move the age category of the girls' championship from U18 to U19 in order to align it with the Boys' U19 World Championship. Athletes should be born on or after 1 January 2005.

Hosts selection
On 2 June 2022, FIVB opened the bidding process for member associations whose countries were interested in hosting one of the four Age Group World Championships in 2023 (i.e., U19 Boys' and Girls' World Championships and U21 Men's and Women's World Championships). The expression of interest of the member associations had to be submitted to FIVB by 29 July 2022, 18:00 CEST (UTC+2).

FIVB announced the hosts for its four Age Group World Championship on 24 January 2023, with the joint bid of Croatia and Hungary being selected to host the 2023 Girls' U19 World Championship. This will be the first time that the FIVB Girls' U19 World Championship is co-hosted by two countries and the second time that Croatia hosts the tournament having previously done in 2001. For its part, Hungary will host a FIVB tournament of any category for the first time.

Qualification
Originally, a total of 20 national teams were going to qualify for the final tournament. However, in January 2023, FIVB confirmed an increase in participating teams from 20 to 24 in order to "facilitate the co-hosting".

In addition to Croatia and Hungary which qualified automatically as the hosts, 19 other teams qualified through five separate continental competitions which had to be completed by 31 December 2022 at the latest. The remaining 3 teams entered by the Girls' U19 FIVB World Ranking among the teams not yet qualified.

The slot allocation was setted as follow:
AVC (Asia & Oceania): 4
CAVB (Africa): 2+1
CEV (Europe): 6
CSV (South America): 3+1
NORCECA (North, Central America and Caribbean): 4
Hosts: 1+1
One slot to be confirmed.
Note

See also
2023 FIVB Volleyball Women's U21 World Championship
2023 FIVB Volleyball Boys' U19 World Championship
2023 FIVB Volleyball Men's U21 World Championship

External links
Age Group World Championships 2023 - Host an Event

References 

FIVB Volleyball Girls' U18 World Championship
FIVB Volleyball Girls' U18 World Championship
World Championship U19
Volleyball
International volleyball competitions hosted by Croatia
International volleyball competitions hosted by Hungary
Volleyball
Volleyball
Volleyball
Sport in Osijek